Hector V. Sarno (April 24,1880 – December 16, 1953) was an American film actor who began in the silent era. He appeared in more than 180 films between 1912 and 1948. He was born in Naples, Italy and died in Pasadena, California.

Partial filmography

 My Hero (1912)
 Heredity (1912)
 The Chief's Blanket (1912)
 Blind Love (1912)
 The Detective's Stratagem (1913)
 The Law and His Son (1913)
 The Mistake (1913)
 The Stolen Bride (1913)
 Pirate Gold (1913)
 Under the Gaslight (1914)
 Graft (1915)
 The Black Sheep of the Family (1916)
 Guilty (1916)
 The Plow Woman (1917)
 The Island of Desire (1917)
 Madame Du Barry (1917)
 The Rose of Blood (1917)
 Some Boy! (1917)
 Go West, Young Man (1918)
 Heart of the Sunset (1918)
 A Little Sister of Everybody (1918)
 The Island of Intrigue (1919)
 The Gray Wolf's Ghost (1919)
 The Forfeit (1919)
 Rio Grande (1920)
 Roman Candles (1920)
 Cheated Hearts (1921)
 Diamonds Adrift (1921)
 Conflict (1921)
 The Wise Kid (1922)
 Do and Dare (1922)
 While Justice Waits (1922)
 Tom Mix in Arabia (1922)
 The Girl of the Golden West (1923)
 Ashes of Vengeance (1923)
 The Song of Love (1923)
 Stepping Fast (1923)
 The Sea Hawk (1924)
 As Man Desires (1925)
 Cobra (1925)
 The Girl from Montmartre (1926)
 The Temptress (1926)
 Her Sacrifice (1926)
 The Climbers (1927)
 The King of Kings (1927)
 The Noose (1928)
 Street Angel (1928)
 Women Everywhere (1930)
 Men Without Law (1930)
 The Pride of the Legion (1932)
 Flight into Nowhere (1938)

References

External links

1880 births
1953 deaths
American male film actors
American male silent film actors
Italian emigrants to the United States
20th-century American male actors
Male actors from Naples